Ashanti Johnson (previously Ashanti Johnson-Pyrtle) is an American geochemist and chemical oceanographer. She is the first African American to earn a doctoral degree in oceanography from Texas A&M University.

Ashanti Johnson has made several notable contributions to stem enlightenment, which earned her the Presidential Award for Excellence in Science, Mathematics, and Engineering Mentoring|2010 Presidential Award for Excellence in Science, Mathematics, and Engineering. Since that time, she has sustained the Minorities Striving and Pursuing Higher Degrees of Success in Earth System Science (MS Ph.D.'S) Professional Development Mentoring Institute and served as the founding CEO/Superintendent of Cirrus Academy, a statewide STEAM (Science, Technology, Engineering, Arts and Mathematics) charter school system in Georgia.

She has served as an associate professor of chemistry at Fort Valley State University, an associate professor of environmental science, an assistant vice provost at the University of Texas at Arlington, and executive director of the Institute for Broadening Participation. She also held faculty positions at the Georgia Institute of Technology School of Earth and Atmospheric Sciences, the Savannah State University Marine Science Program, the University of South Florida College of Marine Science, the University of Texas at Arlington Department of Earth and Environmental Sciences, and the Mercer University Department of Education. Currently, Johnson is a professional speaker on topics of diversity and inclusion in higher education, Youth STEM advocacy, and workplace equity.

Early life and education 
Johnson received her B.S. in 1993 in Marine Science from Texas A&M University-Galveston, where she became the very first African American student body president. She received her Ph.D. in Oceanography from Texas A&M University in 1999. Her areas of research include environmental aquatic radio geochemistry, 2) professional development of students and early-career scientists, and 3) STEM diversity-focused initiatives.  Her radio geochemistry research activities utilize various biogeochemical indicators to interpret past events impacting marine, estuarine, and freshwater environments.

In her "Women Exploring Oceans" interview, Johnson reveals how she initially became interested in the oceans by watching Jacques Cousteau. Her interest was strengthened in fifth grade when she spent a day discussing the oceans with a female marine biology graduate student. Johnson cherishes the childhood memory and has sought to share her interest in the oceans with children, teachers, community leaders, college students, and federal government officials...

Career and research 
Johnson's areas of research specialization include aquatic radio geochemistry, professional development of students, and science and engineering diversity-focused initiatives. Her aquatic radio geochemistry research activities focus on the utilization of various biogeochemical indicators to interpret past events that have impacted the marine, estuarine, and freshwater environments in the Arctic, as well as in coastal regions of Georgia, Florida, and Puerto Rico.

Diversity-focused initiatives in academia 
Johnson's professional development and diversity-focused scholarly activities facilitate research and professional development experiences for students who represent diverse socioeconomic, cultural, gender, racial, and academic backgrounds. She serves as the director of one of four NASA One Stop Shopping Initiative (OSSI) Broker-Facilitator Corps, as well as the director for the NASA and NSF-funded Minorities Striving and Pursuing Higher Degrees of Success in Earth System Science Initiative. She is also the PI of the NSF-funded Pathways to Ocean Science Project and Co-PI of the NSF-funded Pathways to Engineering Project. While an assistant professor at the University of South Florida, Johnson served as the PI and director of the NSF-funded Florida-Georgia Louis Stokes Alliance for Minority Participation USF Bridge to the Doctorate Program and the Alfred P. Sloan Foundation's Minority Ph.D. Program in the College of Marine Science. She also co-directed the NSF-funded USF College of Marine Science OCEANS Graduate STEM Fellows in K-12 Education (OCEANS GK-12) Fellowship Program and facilitated the establishment of the
National Ocean Sciences Bowl's Spoonbill Bowl Regional Competition at USF College of Marine Science.

Johnson is also the chief of science and research at Black Girls Dive. This organization inspires young girls and women to explore aquatic-based recreation activities and career opportunities, and the CEO and superintendent of Cirrus Academy Charter School employs an integrated, hands-on curriculum based on STEAM principles for kindergarten through 12th grade.

Organizational involvement 
Johnson has served as vice president of The STEM Future Foundation, a charitable and educational nonprofit corporation dedicated to providing underserved children in under-resourced urban and rural communities access to leading-edge technology resources and high-quality STEM education. Johnson has served on the NSF's Advisory Committee on Environmental Research and Education, the American Geophysical Union Committee on Education and Human Resources as well as their Subcommittee on Diversity, Association for the Sciences of Limnology and Oceanography Education Committee, International Safe Water Conference Steering Committee, Digital Library for Earth System Education Annual Planning Committee, Savannah River Environmental Sciences Field Station Advisory Board, University of Maine's ADVANCE Rising Tide Center Advisory Board, COSEE: Ocean Systems Advisory Board, Maine Physical Sciences Partnership Advisory Board, MentorNet Geosciences Advisory Board and the Howard University Science, Engineering, and Mathematics Program External Advisory Board. Her recent service activities include serving on the steering committee for the American Academy of Microbiology's "Training the Microbiologist of the Future Colloquium", being on the executive committee of "CHANGES - the Coalition of Hispanic, African and Native Americans for the Next Generation of Engineers and Scientists", and participating in the White House Workshop on STEM Minority Inclusion, as well as the White House Forum on Minorities in Energy. She is the Chief of Research and Science Practice for Black Girls Dive Foundation, an organization dedicated to inspiring and empowering young girls, historically underrepresented in STEM, to pursue careers in the aquatic sciences.

Awards and recognition 
Johnson was awarded the 2019 John P, McGovern Science, and Society Award. by Sigma Xi, the Scientific Research Honor Society. In 2016 she earned the AGU Ambassador Award for her extraordinary achievements in her discipline.  In January 2010 she received a Presidential Award for Excellence in Science, Mathematics and Engineering Mentoring (PAESMEM) at the White House in recognition of her professional development and diversity-related activities. On February 1, 2010, she was recognized by The Grio as one of 100 History Makers in The Making. She was profiled in the Black Enterprise Magazine March 2011 Issue's "Women In STEM" feature story.

In March 2017 she served as the U.S. Department of State's representative to Cambodia for several STEM-focused events including being an invited keynote speaker at the Cambodia Science and Engineering Festival and the US Embassy, as well as at several universities, K-12 schools and a science museum in Cambodia.  She received A 2016 American Geophysical Union Excellence in Geophysical Education Award, a 2016 American Geophysical Union Ambassador Award, and was Conferred as an American Geophysical Union Fellow in 2016.  In the February 2018 issue of Essence Magazine,  Johnson is recognized as one of "STEM'S New Guard" in an article highlighting "15 Women who are Paving the Way and Paying it Forward." In April 2016, Black Enterprise Magazine designated Johnson as one of the "10 Black Women Changing the World via Science and Technology". In 2018, Johnson gave the Ambrose Jearld Jr. lecture sponsored by the Woods Hole Diversity Initiative. In 2019, Johnson was honored by the National Society of Black Physicists.

Johnson has been interviewed on All About STEM Radio, the U.S. Embassy Cambodia's Facebook Live Weekly Program, Cambodia's Voice of America Khmer News, and the Entertainment Industries Council, Inc. (EIC) EIC network.tv Science Engineering & Technology Channel's "Women and Girls at the Intersection of Innovation and Opportunity: A Webcast Series on Harnessing the New Career Potential of STEM + Arts", a Nobody In Particular podcast entitled "Swimming with the Sharks", and a Sigma Xi Google Hangout session on "Engaging more African Americans in STEM".  She was also featured in one of four 2016 Black History Month celebration segments that aired on Fox News Channel's national Fox & Friends show.

Publications 
 Johnson, A., Huggans, M., Siegfried, D., & Braxton, L. (2016). Strategies for Increasing Diversity in the Ocean Science Workforce Through Mentoring. Oceanography, 29(1), 46–54. Retrieved from http://www.jstor.org/stable/24861948.
Nelson, S. A., Hain, E. F., Hartis, B. M. and Johnson, A. (2014) Changing the Game: Multidimensional Mentoring and Partnerships in the Recruitment of Underrepresented Students. In: Taylor, W.W., A. Lynch, and N. Leonard (Eds.) Future of Fisheries: Perspectives for Emerging Professionals. American Fisheries Society Press, Bethesda MD. (in press)
 Johnson, A., and White, N. (2014) Ocean Acidification: The Other Climate Change Issue. American Scientist. Volume 102. p. 60-63
 Pyrtle A.J. and Williamson V.A. (2007) The Minorities Striving and Pursuing Higher Degrees of Success (MS Ph.D.'S) In Earth System Science Professional Development Initiative: Enhancing Intellectual Merit and Broader Impact of Diversity Through Alignment of Vision, Goals and Objectives and Measurement. Journal of Geoscience Education. 55(6) p. 514-521
 Pyrtle, A.J., Powell, J.M, Williamson-Whitney, V.A. (2007) Virtual Community Building for Effective Engagement of Students of Color in Earth System Science:  Minorities Striving and Pursuing Higher Degrees of Success in Earth System Science Case Studies. Journal of Geoscience Education. 55(6) p. 522-530
 NSF Advisory Committee for Environmental Research and Education (including A. J. Pyrtle). (2005) Complex Environmental Systems: Pathways to the Future. National Science Foundation. www.nsf.gov/geo/ere/ereweb. 12pp.
 Pyrtle A. J., Wilborn U.S., Ingall E.D., Grantham M.C., and Elliott W.C. (2004) Radionuclide Distribution and Geochemistry of the Savannah (Georgia) Aquatic Environment. Environmental Monitoring and Restoration. 3, p. 64-72
 Weiler C., Beaulieu S., and other DIALOG III participants (including A. Pyrtle) (2000) Perspectives on Graduate Education Experiences in Aquatic Science. American Society of Limnology and Oceanography Bulletin, 9(1)
 Johnson-Pyrtle A. (2003) Marginal Seas. In Water: Science and Issues, ed. E. Julius Dasch. New York: Macmillan Reference USA, p. 54-57 (Invited Contribution)
 Johnson-Pyrtle A., Scott M., Laing T., and Smol J. (2000) Cs-137 Distribution and Geochemistry of Lena River (Siberia) Drainage Basin Lake Sediments. The Science of the Total Environment, 255(1-3), p. 145-159
 Cooper L., Beasley T., Dolvin S., Grebmeier J., Kelley J., Scott M. and Johnson-Pyrtle A. (1998) The Distribution of Radiocesium and Plutonium in Sea Ice-Entrained Arctic Sediments about Potential Sources and Sinks. J. Environmental Radioactivity, 39(3), p. 279-303

References

External links 
Publications by Ashanti Johnson, in Bright Minds Speakers

Living people
African-American women academics
American women academics
African-American academics
American oceanographers
American geochemists
21st-century American women scientists
Women geochemists
Women oceanographers
University of Texas at Arlington faculty
Year of birth missing (living people)
Members of the National Society of Black Physicists
21st-century African-American women
21st-century African-American scientists